The 1905 Harvard Crimson football team represented Harvard University in the 1905 college football season. The Crimson finished with an 8–2–1 record under head coach Bill Reid, who had coached Harvard in 1901.  Walter Camp selected two Harvard players (tackle Beaton Squires and guard Francis Burr) as first-team players on his 1905 College Football All-America Team.  Caspar Whitney selected three Harvard players as first-team members of his All-America team: Burr, tackle Karl Brill and halfback Daniel Hurley.

Schedule

References

Harvard
Harvard Crimson football seasons
Harvard Crimson football
1900s in Boston